The football sporting event at the 1919 Far Eastern Championship Games featured matches between China and the Philippines. China was represented by South China A.A.

Results

Gold medal play-off

Winner

Statistics

Goalscorers

References

1919 in Philippine sport
Football at the Far Eastern Championship Games
International association football competitions hosted by the Philippines
1919 in Asian football